Kanoli is a small village located in Maharashtra, India, in Sangamner tehsil of Ahmadnagar district. The nearest town is Sangamner, located approximately 16 km to the northwest.

Kanoli has a population of approximately 3,600. It is part of the Shirdi assembly and parliamentary constituency.

References 

Villages in Ahmednagar district